Florian-Ayala Fauna is an American artist, musician, poet, and music producer. Fauna is the main member of the post-industrial music project uncertain.

Personal life
Florian-Ayala Fauna was born in Norfolk, Virginia. At age 5, Fauna moved to Bombay Beach, California in Southern California along the Salton Sea. She credits the place as an inspiration to her music. She described it as a "post-apocalyptic-looking town." At age 12, she began experimenting with sampling and rough recordings with a microphone.

In 2002, Fauna lived in the exurb community of Indio, California. At age 21, she moved to Buffalo, New York where she has been part of Buffalo, New York's experimental art and music scene. Fauna experiences esoteric visions which is involved in her art due to temporal lobe epilepsy. She has chronic fatigue syndrome and is intersex which plays a role in much of her art.  She is trans-femme and uses she/her pronouns.

Art

Fauna is a multidisciplinary artist whose work has been exhibited at the Centre Georges Pompidou in Paris, France, a Coil-themed exhibition in Berlin, Germany, and in the United Kingdom as well as locally in Buffalo, New York. Fauna's artwork utilizes collage, film, painting, photography, and poetry. Her work includes  occult, psychedelia, chaos and spiritual enlightenment. Animal imagery include deer, foxes, goats, hares, birds, and wolves. She cites the Surrealists as an influence.

Music

uncertain
In 2007, uncertain began as the solo project of Florian-Ayala Fauna. Initially, she made ambient and drone music with the computer programme Ableton. Her first album glass fawn was an ambient soundscape about a deer getting lost. It often involved field recordings, processed sounds, and tape loops while their current cycle (since 2012) features albums about a family of foxes done with composition, sampling, and complex music production on Ableton Live and Kontakt. Influences include Aleister Crowley, Hermeticism, Arvo Pärt, Coil, Current 93, Throbbing Gristle, and alchemy. As of 2016, Fauna is the main producer and collaborates with others, primarily with Felix Keigh who is her fiancé and main vocalist.

Live performances 
uncertain started doing live performances in 2013. Cities for live performances have included Boston, Cincinnati, Columbus, Ohio, and New York City. However, her chronic fatigue limits touring. They use visuals such as the use of animal masks, candles, lights, video projections, and ritualistic costumes. Live shows have included performances alongside TRNSGNDR/VHS.

Collaborations
Fauna has collaborated with former Coil member Stephen Thrower (Cyclobe, UnicaZürn), Esperik Glare's Charlie Martineau (In Serpents and Seas), and others. Thrower contributed an opening track to her 2016 album Dark Night of the Soul. She has also frequently done artwork for Swiss post-industrial musicians and artists Black Sun Productions. Her most recent collaboration was with London-based industrial hip hop artist Ubik MCDXCII, providing production work for the track "Rites and Ceremonies" on his album "Blackout Blinds".

Reception
In February 2013, Orange County, California alternative weekly OC Weeklys Dave Barton called dancing with the blind (lost children) "atmospheric and haunting" and "one of the most evocative titles for an album I've ever heard." In August 2016, The Publics Cory Perla described both her art and music as "otherworldly." In March 2017, British music magazine The Quietuss Russell Cuzner summed up her music as "somehow fulfil[s] a similar aesthetic to the artist's equally prolific visual art that often depict animal heads [...] as if charged with some kind of hidden power, part gothic horror, part Gnostic totem." In December 2019, Columbus Alives Andy Downing said God Is a Man Eater was "dense, buzzing, six-track song cycle."

Politics 
Fauna supports anti-fascism and identifies as an anarchist.

Discography

See also
List of ambient music artists
List of androgynous people
List of dark ambient artists
List of experimental musicians
List of noise musicians
List of people from Buffalo, New York
List of people from Hampton Roads, Virginia
List of people from Virginia
List of people with chronic fatigue syndrome
List of transgender people
List of intersex people

References

External links 
 
 
 

Ambient musicians
American experimental musicians
American industrial musicians
Artists from Norfolk, Virginia
Intersex non-binary people
American LGBT musicians
Living people
Musicians from Norfolk, Virginia
People with epilepsy
American noise musicians
Transgender musicians
Year of birth missing (living people)
Non-binary musicians
Transgender non-binary people
Intersex musicians